Amaithi is a village in the Benipur block of Darbhanga district in the state of Bihar, India.

References 

Villages in Darbhanga district